Reinaldo Leandro Mora (May 23, 1920 – November 4, 2013) was a Venezuelan educator and politician. He was part of Acción Democrática. He was deputy Minister of Education between January and March 1961 and got his official designation as Minister from March 1961 to 1964, under President Rómulo Betancourt administration (1959-1964). Under President Raúl Leoni administration (1964-1969) he was the Venezuelan Plenipotentiary Ambassador in the Vatican. From 1966 to 1969, he was Minister of Internal Affairs. He was Senator in the former Venezuelan bicameral Congress (until 1999), and President of the Senate of Venezuela from 1984 to 1989.

Leandro Mora's key facts on Venezuelan political life 
He was one of the most important candidates of Accion Democratica Party National Convention toward presidential election in December 1973. He got 180 votes but Carlos Andres Perez was elected as presidential candidate (and Venezuelan president in 1973 election) with 300 votes.

He was considered as a solid name for the Accion Democratica candidature in 1982 and 1987, but he refused the idea of being presidential candidate again. 
 
After his years as Congressman, Leandro Mora was president of the Presidential Commission on Marine and Submarine Frontier Waters with Republic of Colombia en 1989. This is very important due to the delicate military crisis that involved both countries during 1987's Corbeta Caldas incident in the Gulf of Venezuela.

Leandro Mora's legacy 
Nelson Bocaranda, an experienced Venezuelan journalist wrote about his public service:

Leandro Mora's publications 
 Pintura venezolana 1661-1961 (1961). 
 La Comunidad Nacional (1967).
 Fundación de La Guaira: Origen, desarrollo y destino de un pueblo (1967).
 La Constitución de la República: Sin vocación a riesgo de vigencia efímera (1986).

References 

1920 births
2013 deaths
People from Caracas
Venezuelan politicians
Ambassadors of Venezuela to the Holy See
Democratic Action (Venezuela) politicians
Presidents of the Senate of Venezuela
Education ministers of Venezuela